Francesco Vitali (born Fragiskos Vitali; 20 January 1976) is a Greek-American Business Advisor, Manager, film executive producer, director, writer, actor and serial Entrepreneur based in Los Angeles. He is best known for co-founding and managing 48FILM Project, an international short film festival.

Life and work

Vitali was born in Athens and grew up in Piraeus. His father's family came from Italy. He studied journalism and became an apprentice journalist in the newspaper Ethnos.

Having moved to Los Angeles, Vitali renovated a historic Hollywood theater called Tamarind Theater and brought the English director Di Trevis to direct plays by Pinter and Brecht, in which he played leading roles. While playing Hamlet in the Tamarind, he met George Clooney, who cast him in the same role in episodes 1.3 and 1.4 of Unscripted that he directed himself.

Back in Greece, Vitali started a film festival together with Chris Siametis in 2008. To be able to found an international festival, they moved to Cyprus, set up an online company and made an ecological online film festival called 48 Go Green. Within 20 days, they had 330 entries from all over the world. Deciding to increase the scope of the festival, they both moved to Los Angeles.

48FILM Project

Vitali as executive producer and Siametis as co-executive producer created an online festival for short films and called it 48 Film Project. In the competition, professional and amateur filmmakers worldwide are given 48 hours to write, film, edit, produce and upload a short 4-7 minute movie.

In 2009, Vitali and Siametis launched 48 Music Project as a pilot project where musicians had to create an original song within 48 hours. The project was endorsed by Sony Music, and singer and composer Dimitra Galani was president of the jury.

More than 75,000 filmmakers from 130 countries actively participated in the 48 Film Project festival by 2016. For the last five years, the finalists' films have been screened at the Directors Guild of America.

In 2017, Vitali and Siametis started 48Film Project Hellas 2017 - Respect Greece, a festival aimed at Greek and Cypriot filmmakers, artists, directors and producers. It was announced that footage from the films would be used to rebrand Greece in the documentary Respect Greece, presenting Greek culture to the world, to be directed by Vitali, hosted by Nana Palaitsaki, and produced by Chris Siametis and Alexia Melocchi.

Vitali is currently directing and producing the psychological thriller Gates of Hades (2018), inspired by the Greek myth of Persephone.

References

External links
 

1976 births
Living people
Greek film producers
American film producers
People from Piraeus